Cırdaxan (also, Dzhirdakhan and Dzhyrdakhan) is a small village and municipality in the Yevlakh Rayon of Azerbaijan.  It has a population of 455.

References 

Populated places in Yevlakh District